= Bibliography of works on Steven Spielberg =

A list of books and essays about Steven Spielberg:

- Buckland, Warren (19 April 2006). Directed by Steven Spielberg: Poetics of the Contemporary Hollywood Blockbuster. Continuum. ISBN 978-0-8264-1691-9.
- Kowalski, Dean (21 November 2008). Steven Spielberg and Philosophy: We're Gonna Need a Bigger Book. University Press of Kentucky. ISBN 978-0-8131-2527-5.
- McBride, Joseph (1 September 2012). Steven Spielberg: A Biography (Third ed.). Faber & Faber. ISBN 978-0-571-28055-1.
- Morris, Nigel (13 August 2013). The Cinema of Steven Spielberg: Empire of Light. Columbia University Press. ISBN 978-0-231-50345-7.
- Spielberg, Steven (2000). Steven Spielberg: Interviews. Univ. Press of Mississippi. ISBN 978-1-57806-113-6.

== Individual films ==
Schindler's List

- Loshitzky, Yosefa (1 January 1997). Spielberg's Holocaust: Critical Perspectives on Schindler's List. Indiana University Press. ISBN 0-253-21098-4.
- Palowski, Franciszek (1998). The Making of Schindler's List: Behind the Scenes of an Epic Film. Carol Publishing Group. ISBN 978-1-55972-445-6.
